Eli is a 2019 American horror film directed by Ciarán Foy from a screenplay by David Chirchirillo, Ian Goldberg, and Richard Naing, based on a story by Chirchirillo. It stars Kelly Reilly, Sadie Sink, Lili Taylor, Max Martini, and Charlie Shotwell. The film follows a boy with a rare autoimmune disease who is taken by his parents to a private medical facility to be cured and suddenly begins to experience paranormal occurrences.

Eli was produced by Paramount Pictures, Paramount Players, MTV Films, Intrepid Pictures and Bellevue Productions and was released on October 18, 2019, by Netflix, making it the first film from Paramount Players to not receive a theatrical release. It received mixed reviews from critics, with praise for its performances and atmosphere, and criticism for its slow pacing and tone.

Plot 
Eli Miller is a young boy suffering from a rare disease that causes severe allergic reactions to the outdoors, forcing him to live his life in protective gear. His parents, Rose and Paul, have taken him to Dr. Isabella Horn's secluded medical facility, a large, old house that has been modernized and quarantined. Eli is initially overjoyed that the facility allows him to remove his "bubble suit", embrace his parents, and enjoy comforts previously denied to him. His joy is short-lived, however, as he begins to experience supernatural phenomena in the house. He also begins his treatments, which are excruciatingly painful. The spectres repeatedly leave him the message lie, and Eli begins to wonder if they are trying to warn him about Horn's treatments.

Eli befriends Haley, a young girl with whom he speaks through a large window in the house's first floor. She is the only person who believes his claims that the house is haunted. She tells him none of the other patients Horn treated left the facility, implying that they died. Eli discovers the word "LIE" is actually the inverted number 317, the passcode to Horn's office. When he investigates the office, he finds Horn's records of past patients, showing that all of them were killed by the third and final treatment.

Eli unsuccessfully tries to persuade his parents that they need to leave the facility but Paul tries to drug him into unconsciousness. Hurt and confused, Eli barricades himself in Horn's office. He finds a photograph of Horn and her assistants dressed as nuns, and a hidden passageway to an underground room with religious paraphernalia. Horn locks him inside and he experiences an allergic reaction and passes out. When he awakes, he finds he can breathe fine, and he actually has no disease. Rose, feeling guilty for deceiving Eli, goes to him. Eli pretends he's still unconscious. When she opens the gate, he knocks her unconscious with a crucifix and flees but is recaptured by Horn and his father.

His mother regains consciousness and finds a dagger in the crucifix. She also discovers that the stone monument in the room conceals the bodies of Horn's previous patients, bound and adorned with religious symbols. Horrified and enraged, she forces her way into the treatment room but Paul subdues her. It is then revealed that Eli is actually an illegitimate child of Satan himself, and his "allergic reactions" were actually manifestations of his developing demonic abilities. Horn begins the third "treatment:" a religious ritual meant to end Eli's life. When she tries to stab him with the sacrificial dagger, Eli displays very strong bursts of telekinetic energy to levitate Horn and her assistants in the air, spin upside-down (resembling the Cross of St. Peter), then bursts into flames. He also sets the house on fire. Eli's mother reveals that she wanted a son so badly, she turned to Satan, who lied that Eli would be a normal child. Eli's stepfather advances with the sacrificial dagger, but Eli kills him by crushing his face telekinetically.

Eli and his mother leave the burning house. Haley greets them in front of a car, again telling Eli he is stronger than the others, who were his sadly departed paternal half-brothers and half-sister, and were also devil/human hybrids. She reveals that she, too, is an illegitimate child of Satan, and that she was unable to tell him, as he had to find and prove his own strength in order to "earn his place." She offers to take Eli to his biological father. When he accepts, Haley wonders if Eli can trust his mother. He indicates that she can, and the film ends with Rose driving the two children away from the burning facility.

Cast 
 Charlie Shotwell as Eli Miller who is revealed to be the illegitimate son of the Devil himself, having inherited incredibly strong telekinetic and pyrokinetic abilities from him.
 Kelly Reilly as Rose Miller, Eli's mother who prayed to the Devil himself for a child when God abandoned her. She leaves with Eli and his half-sister Haley to take them to their demon father. 
 Max Martini as Paul Miller, Eli's Father who is revealed to not be his biological father.
 Lili Taylor as Dr. Isabella Horn, a doctor who plans to "cure" Eli of his "rare condition."
 Sadie Sink as Haley, a teenage girl who assists Eli, and is revealed to be his older paternal half-sister
 Deneen Tyler as Nurse Barbara
 Katia Gomez as Nurse Maricela
 Austin Foxx as Perry Hobbes who was a devil/human hybrid who was killed by Dr. Horn's treatments. He was Eli's older half-brother.
 Kailia Posey as Agnes Thorne, a devil/human hybrid who was killed by Dr. Horn's treatments. She was Eli's older half-sister.
 Parker Lovein as Lucius Woodhouse who was a devil/human hybrid who was killed by Dr. Horn's treatments. He was Eli's older half-brother.
 Lou Beatty Jr. as Motel owner
 Jared Bankens as Gang leader
 Nathaniel Woolsey as Punks #1
 Mitchell De Rubira as Punks #2
 Kaleb Naquin as Punks #3

Production

Development 
David Chirchirillo's screenplay was mentioned in the 2015 Black List, compiling the best scripts of the year. In March 2017, it was announced that Ciarán Foy would direct the film, with Ian Goldberg and Richard Naing contributing to Chirchirillo's screenplay.

Trevor Macy and John Zaozirny produced the film, while Melinda Nishioka served as a co-producer. Daniel Hammond and Gabriel Hammond executive produced the film under their Broad Green Pictures, Intrepid Pictures and Bellevue Productions banners, respectively.

Casting 
In October 2017, Charlie Shotwell was cast to star in the film. In December 2017, Sadie Sink and Kelly Reilly also joined the cast. In January 2018, Lili Taylor and Max Martini were also added.

Filming 
Principal photography began in January 2018 in New Orleans, Louisiana.

Release 
In October 2017, Paramount Players acquired distribution rights to the project, and set it for a January 4, 2019, release. However, Netflix bought distribution rights to the film from Paramount after Paramount reportedly could not figure out how to market the film. Netflix released it on their service on October 18, 2019.

Reception 
The site's critical consensus states, "Intermittently effective if not wholly successful, Eli offers horror fans a handful of jump scares in search of a truly terrifying story."

See also 
 Bubble Boy, whose protagonist is also diagnosed with a similar disease.
 David Vetter

References

External links 
 
 

2019 films
2019 horror films
2010s supernatural horror films
American supernatural horror films
Intrepid Pictures films
Films shot in Louisiana
MTV Films films
English-language Netflix original films
Paramount Pictures films
Paramount Players films
Religious horror films
Films scored by Bear McCreary
Mad scientist films
2010s English-language films
2010s American films